The England cricket team toured India from 30 October 2012 to 27 January 2013. The tour consisted of four Test matches, five One Day Internationals and two Twenty20 International matches. A three-day training camp was held from 26 to 28 October at the International Cricket Council Global Cricket Academy in Dubai, United Arab Emirates, before the tour. The England team returned to the United Kingdom after the Twenty20 series and returned in the new year for the One Day International series. During the intervening period, India hosted Pakistan for two T20Is and three ODIs. At the conclusion of the tour, the English team travelled to New Zealand.

England's 2–1 Test series win was their first series victory in India since the 1984–85 tour. The former England captain Michael Vaughan said that the series victory was bigger than the 2010–11 Ashes series victory in Australia. He said of Alastair Cook that "he has led England to probably their biggest achievement in many, many years".

On 23 December 2012, Sachin Tendulkar announced his retirement from ODI cricket.

Squads

Notes
 1 Stuart Meaker was brought into the England squad as cover for the injured Steven Finn.
 2 Ashok Dinda replaced the injured Umesh Yadav in the Indian squad for the 3rd Test.
 3 James Tredwell was called up to the England test squad as cover for Graeme Swann and Monty Panesar.
 4 Parvinder Awana, Piyush Chawla and Ravindra Jadeja replaced Zaheer Khan, Yuvraj Singh and Harbhajan Singh in the India Test squad for the 4th Test.
 5 Ambati Rayudu replaced Manoj Tiwary

Tour matches

First-class: India A v England XI

Three-day: Mumbai A v England XI

First-class: Haryana v England XI

List A: India A v England XI

List A: Delhi v England XI

Test series

1st Test

2nd Test

3rd Test

4th Test

Statistics

Individual

Team

T20I series

1st T20I

2nd T20I

ODI series

1st ODI

2nd ODI

3rd ODI

4th ODI

5th ODI

References

External links
 India v England in 2012/13 at ESPNcricinfo.com

2012 in English cricket
2012 in Indian cricket
2013 in English cricket
2013 in Indian cricket
2012-13
Indian cricket seasons from 2000–01
International cricket competitions in 2012–13